Acerbas is an Indomalayan genus of skipper butterflies.

Species
Species in Acerbas are:
 Acerbas anthea (Hewitson, 1868)  (Burma to Malaya, Java, Cambodia, Luzon)
 Acerbas azona (Hewitson, 1866) (Celebes)
 Acerbas duris (Mabille, 1883) (Philippines)
 Acerbas latefascia de Jong, 1982 (Celebes)
 Acerbas nitidifasciata Elwes & Edwards, 1897
 Acerbas sarala (de Nicéville, 1889)
 Acerbas selta Evans, 1949 (Borneo)
 Acerbas suttoni Russel, 1984 (Celebes)

Former species
Acerbas martini (Distant and Pryer, 1887) - transferred to Cerba martini (Distant and Pryer, 1887)

Biology 
Acerbas anthea larvae feed on Calamus.

References

External links

 Natural History Museum Lepidoptera genus database
Acerbas  de Nicéville, 1895 at Markku Savela's Lepidoptera and Some Other Life Forms

Erionotini
Hesperiidae genera